"Sonic Boom" is the thirty-fourth single by the Japanese hip-hop group Lead. It was released on August 25, 2021, nearly a year after their previous single Tuxedo. 

It debuted at No. 10 on the Oricon Singles Chart.

The single was released in four formats: a standard CD, two CD+DVD editions, and a CD+booklet edition.

Information
Sonic Boom is the thirty-fourth single released by Lead on August 25, 2021. It is their first single of 2021. It debuted at No. 10 on the Oricon Singles Chart.

The single was released in four formats: a standard CD, two CD+DVD editions, and a CD+booklet edition. The CD contains the title track, along with the two coupling tracks "Get Over" and "Te Quiero Mucho". Both CD+DVD editions house "Sonic Boom" and "Get Over", while the CD+Booklet carries "Sonic Boom" and "Te Quiero Mucho". The Type A DVD houses the music video and making video of the cover art. The Type B DVD has excerpts from their Lead Special Winter Live, which was performed on February 18, 2020 at Harevutai in Tokyo.

The track "Sonic Boom" was written and composed by Lead's Akira Kagimoto. Both he and lead rapper Shinya Taniuchi wrote the lyrical portion. The coupling track "Get Over" (stylized as GET OVER) was written and composed by HIKARI and Swedish songwriter Erik Lidbom, while Lead's own Keita Furuya wrote the lyrics. The other coupling track, "Te Quiero Mucho", was composed by  Oliver Fernstrom and Viktor Strand. The lyrics were written by Japanese lyricist Mayu Wakisaka, with the rap portion written by Shinya.

Music video
Prior to the music video's release, an announcement was made recruiting a marching band to appear in the video. Kaetsu Ariake Junior and Senior High School Marching Band ESTEAM (est. 1993), Baton Twirling Club, and Dance Club were chosen to perform in the video.

Track listing

Charts

References

2021 singles
2021 songs
Japanese-language songs
Pony Canyon singles
Lead (band) songs
Songs written by Erik Lidbom